Andrei Frantsevich Belloli (Russian: Андрей Францевич Беллоли; 1820, Rome - 1881, Saint Petersburg) was an Italian-born Russian painter; known primarily for his female nudes.

Biography 
He studied art at the Accademia di San Luca. During the Revolutions of 1848, he left Italy. In 1850, he settled in Saint Petersburg and initially worked as a decorative painter for churches and palaces; creating everything from small door decorations to plafonds. Later he began to do portraits; mostly of women and children, in oils and colored pencils.

He participated regularly in exhibitions and, in 1861, was named an "Academician" for portrait painting by the Imperial Academy of Arts. In 1869, he organized an exhibition and sale, with the proceeds to benefit poor students and the widows and orphans of artists.

In 1870, for his fiftieth birthday, he was awarded the Order of St. Stanislaus. That same year, he donated one of his best-known works "After the Bath" to the Academy's museum. He created several variations on this theme, one of which ("The Bather") was purchased by Grand Duke Nikolai Konstantinovich. It is now at the Museum of Arts of Uzbekistan in Tashkent, where the Grand Duke died.

Although his paintings were popular with the public, they generally received poor critical notices. In 1877, the writer and critic, Vsevolod Garshin dismissed them as "nice, pretty ladies" with no emotional content.

For many years, he continued to be involved in activities that benefitted Russian art and artists but, for unknown reasons, he committed suicide in 1881.

Works

References

Literature

External links

1820 births
1881 deaths
19th-century painters from the Russian Empire
Russian male painters
Italian emigrants to Russia
Russian portrait painters
Artists who committed suicide
Recipients of the Order of Saint Stanislaus (Russian)
1880s suicides